On June 27, 2007 the Historic Fry Street area of Denton, Texas was burned down. The area referred to as "Fry Street" is the area between Fry St/Welch St and Oak St/Hickory St. The Tomato, a local pizza place frequented by University of North Texas and Texas Womans University students, was the primary target damaged by the fire but the entire block was demolished by police and firefighters before the next morning. The fire took place the day before the scheduled date for the building's demolition.  The area had been at the center of a contentious battle between Save Fry Street and United Equities Inc.

Background 
Houston based developer United Equities Inc. bought most of the commercial lots on and around Fry Street, with plans to raze them in exchange for "upscale" businesses including the anchor store for the project, a CVS Pharmacy.On May 10, 2006 word began to spread around town of the purchase, and students began to organize a group called Save Fry Street with flyers and the Internet. Protests by residents and current and former University of North Texas students angered by plans to raze and redevelop the area began and would last over a year until the fire.

The Tomato restaurant closed on May 13, 2007 along with Bagheri's Italian Restaurant, Java Flakes, Texas Jive, Naranja Cafe, the Spirit Station and Andy's Hair Spot. On June 22–23, Habitat for Humanity of Denton County hosted an auction of building materials salvaged from buildings slated for demolition. Overnight, vandals defaced a 1980s-era mural, portions of which had been auctioned off for $1,600. On June 25, workers began to clear the buildings, ripping out the insides. Local protesters began to squat inside the emptied-out Tomato, despite the organization "Save Fry Street" asking protesters not to do so.

The fire 
The Fry Street Fire was set around 11 p.m.  Hundreds of students were at the bars in the area, and watched the fire. More students gathered after the news had reached them. The 22-year-old man accused of torching The Tomato in protest of the redevelopment surrendered to fire marshals and posted bail on July 11, 2007.

Bohemia Rising: The Story of Fry Street DVD Compilation 

In 2007, Christopher Largen produced and directed The Burning of Fry Street, an award-winning documentary about an arts community protest that evolves into arson and economic terrorism.

Save Fry Street 

Save Fry Street is a group of concerned citizens who mobilized to try to stop the demolition of Fry Street. This is part of their mission statement, which is available online:

We are not against improvement, or even growth. But we are against the destruction of a historical cultural center of Denton–one with deep roots in the college community. A large percentage of Denton is made up of small, local stores and restaurants. Many tenants of Fry Street have wanted repairs to the buildings but found the landlord unwilling to maintain the general upkeep required. Most had to rely on themselves to improve their rental property. We want improvement, but don't need demolishing.

Norah Jones, Grammy Award-winning artist, was named the Honorary Chairwoman of Save Fry Street on December 21, 2006.

Role of the Internet 
Video and pictures of the Fry Street Fire were on the Internet within 3 hours of the fire starting. Popular sites such as MySpace.com and YouTube.com were used to spread the footage to more people.
YouTube Video

References 

Culture of Denton, Texas
Fires in Texas
2007 fires in the United States
2007 in Texas
Urban fires in the United States